This is a partial list of notable shopping malls/shopping centres in Indonesia.

Greater Jakarta

Central Java

Semarang
Java Mall

Yogyakarta
 Ambarrukmo Plaza

East Java

Surabaya
 Ciputra World
 Pakuwon Mall
 Tunjungan Plaza
 Marvell City
 Grand City Mall Surabaya
 BG Junction Surabaya
 Pakuwon City Mall
 Galaxy Mall
 Royal Plaza
 WTC Surabaya
 Lagoon Avenue Sungkono
 Plaza Surabaya
 Pasar Atom Mall
 Lenmarc Mall
 Transicon Mall Surabaya
 City of Tommorow Mall

North Sumatera

Medan
 Centre Point
 Plaza Medan Fair
 Sun Plaza
 Podomoro City Deli Medan
 Thamrin Plaza
 Medan Mall
 Ring Road City Walks Mall
 Suzuya Marelan Plaza
 Irian Marelan
 Plaza Millenium
 Manhattan Times Square
 Lippo Plaza Medan

West Kalimantan

Singkawang
 Singkawang Grand Mall (SGM)

North Kalimantan

Tarakan
 Grand Tarakan Mall

Notes

 
Shopping malls
Indonesia